Muhammad Karim Babak (born; 1947) is a Pakistani politician who had been a member of the National Assembly of Pakistan from 1988 to 1990 and 1997 to 2002.

Political career
Babak also served as Minister of transportation of the Khyber Pakhtunkhwa Assembly from 2008 to 2013.

References

Living people
Pashtun people
North-West Frontier Province MPAs 1988–1990
Awami National Party MPAs (Khyber Pakhtunkhwa)
People from Buner District
1947 births
Awami National Party politicians
Government Post Graduate College, Swabi alumni